Struve 2398 (Gliese 725) is a binary star system in the northern constellation of Draco. Struve 2398 is star number 2398 in the Struve Double Star Catalog of Baltic-German astronomer Friedrich Georg Wilhelm von Struve. The astronomer's surname, and hence the star identifier, is sometimes indicated by a Greek sigma, Σ; hence, this system can be listed with the identifier Σ 2398. Although the components are too faint to be viewed with the naked eye, this star system is among the closest to the Sun.

Both stars are small red dwarfs, with each having around a third the Sun's mass and radius. They each display the type of variability common to flare stars, and their active surfaces are sources of X-ray emission. They are orbiting with period of about 295 years, at a separation of about 56 astronomical units with an orbital eccentricity (ovalness) of 0.70.

The pair has a relatively high proper motion of 2.2 arc seconds per year. The system is on an orbit through the Milky Way that has an eccentricity of 0.05, carrying them as close as 8 kpc and as far as 9 kpc from the Galactic Center. The plane of their galactic orbit carries them as far as 463−489 pc away from the galactic plane.

Planetary system
In 2016, a planet candidate on a 2.7-day orbit was proposed around Struve 2398 B, although the signal was found to be comparable with an instrumental noise floor. In 2019, two candidate planets were detected in orbit around component B using the radial velocity method, without detection of the previous candidate.

See also
 List of nearest stars

References

External links
 SolStation entry
 http://www.daviddarling.info/encyclopedia/S/Struve2398.html
 http://www.richweb.f9.co.uk/astro/nearby_stars.htm
 http://jumk.de/astronomie/near-stars/struve-2398.shtml
 Struve 2398 in Dra

173739 40
091768 72
0725
BD+59 1915
Draco (constellation)
Local Bubble
M-type main-sequence stars
Binary stars
Flare stars
Hypothetical planetary systems